James Davey may refer to:
 James Davey (rugby union), British rugby union player
 James Davey (rugby league), English rugby league player
 James E. Davey, Northern Irish Presbyterian minister, historian and theologian